The Autovía A-33 is a proposed highway in Murcia, Spain between Cieza and Font de la Figuera. It follows or is an upgrade of the N-344 and will link the Autovía A-30 east of Cieza with the Autovía A-31/Autovía A-35 at Font de la Figuera north east of Murcia. It passes via Jumilla and Yecla over the Sierra del Buey close to the Puerto de Jumilla (810m).

References 

A-33
A-33
A-33